Messiah  is an American thriller streaming television series created by Michael Petroni. The first season consists of ten episodes, which were released on Netflix on January 1, 2020. The series stars Mehdi Dehbi, Tomer Sisley, Michelle Monaghan, John Ortiz, Melinda Page Hamilton, Stefania LaVie Owen, Jane Adams, Sayyid El Alami, Fares Landoulsi, and Wil Traval. In March 2020, the series was canceled after one season.

Premise
The series focuses on the modern world's reaction to a man – who first appears in the Middle East – whose followers claim him to be the eschatological return of ʿĪsā (Jesus in Arabic). His sudden appearance and apparent miracles spark a growing international following, casting doubts around who he really is, a case investigated by a CIA Case Officer.

Cast

Main
 Mehdi Dehbi as al-Masih (Payam Golshiri)
 Tomer Sisley as Aviram Dahan
 Michelle Monaghan as CIA Case Officer Eva Geller
 John Ortiz as Felix Iguero
 Melinda Page Hamilton as Anna Iguero
 Stefania LaVie Owen as Rebecca Iguero
 Jane Adams as Miriam Keneally
 Sayyid El Alami as Jibril Medina
 Fares Landoulsi as Samir
 Wil Traval as Will Mathers

Recurring
 Philip Baker Hall as Zelman Katz
 Beau Bridges as Edmund DeGuilles
 Hugo Armstrong as Ruben
 Barbara Eve Harris as Katherin
 Nimrod Hochenberg as Israel
 Emily Kinney as Staci Kirmani
 Jackson Hurst as Jonah Kirmani
 Nicole Rose Scimeca as Raeah Kirmani
 Makram Khoury as Mullah Omar
 Ori Pfeffer as Alon
 Rona-Lee Shimon as Mika Dahan
 Kenneth Miller as Larry
 Assaâd Bouab as Qamar Maloof
Dermot Mulroney as President John Young

Episodes

Production

Development
On November 17, 2017, it was announced that Netflix had given the production a series order for a first season consisting of ten episodes. The series was created by Michael Petroni who is also credited as an executive producer and showrunner of the series. Additional executive producers include Andrew Deane, James McTeigue, Mark Burnett and Roma Downey. Production companies involved with the series include Industry Entertainment and LightWorkers Media. On March 26, 2020, Netflix canceled the series after one season.

Casting
In January 2018, it was announced that John Ortiz, Tomer Sisley and Mehdi Dehbi would star in the series. In May 2018, it was announced that Michelle Monaghan had been cast in a starring role. In June 2018, it was reported that Melinda Page Hamilton, Stefania LaVie Owen, Jane Adams, Sayyid El Alami, Fares Landoulsi and Wil Traval had joined the main cast. In the same month, it was announced that Beau Bridges and Philip Baker Hall had joined the cast in a recurring capacity. This was Hall’s final credit, prior to his death in 2022.

Filming
Principal photography for the first season took place in Amman, Jordan; Albuquerque, Mountainair, Estancia, Belen, Santa Fe and Clines Corners, New Mexico from June 2018 to August 2018.

Release

Marketing
On December 3, 2019, the official trailer for the series was released by Netflix.

Reception

The review aggregator website Rotten Tomatoes reported a 44% approval rating for the first season, based on critic 27 reviews. The website's critical consensus states, "A promising premise and superb ensemble can't save Messiah from its own bland storytelling." On Metacritic, the season has a weighted average score of 46 out of 100, based on 8 critics, indicating "mixed or average reviews".

The trailer received negative reception from some Muslim audiences. In December 2019, it was announced in a press conference that The Royal Film Commission of Jordan requested Netflix to refrain from streaming Messiah in the country due to the provocative subject matter and controversial religious content covered in the series.

References

External links
  (official website)
 

2020s American drama television series
2020 American television series debuts
2020 American television series endings
American action television series
American thriller television series
Arabic-language Netflix original programming
English-language Netflix original programming
Fictional depictions of the Antichrist
Serial drama television series
Television controversies in the United States
Television series about the Central Intelligence Agency
Television series by MGM Television
Television shows filmed in Jordan
Television shows filmed in New Mexico
Television shows set in Algeria
Television shows set in Arkansas
Television shows set in Delaware
Television shows set in Israel
Television shows set in Jordan
Television shows set in Maryland
Television shows set in Palestine
Television shows set in Syria
Television shows set in Texas
Television shows set in Virginia
Television shows set in Washington, D.C.
Works by Michael Petroni